Deroceras fatrense is a species of air-breathing land slug, a terrestrial pulmonate gastropod mollusk in the family Agriolimacidae.

This species is endemic to Slovakia.

References

Agriolimacidae
Endemic fauna of Slovakia
Gastropods described in 1981
Taxonomy articles created by Polbot
Taxobox binomials not recognized by IUCN